Justine Otto (born 1974) is a German painter.

Life
Otto was born in Poland. 
In 1983, she moved to Germany. 
Between 1997 and 2000, she worked as a stage designer at the Municipal Theatre Frankfurt. 
In 1996, she studied at the State Academy of Fine Arts (Städelschule) in Frankfurt am Main, and was a master student in professional free painting, where she studied with Peter Angermann and Michael Krebber. In 2003, she graduated.
Otto lives in Hamburg and Frankfurt.

Works
The central theme of her work are adolescent people and their feelings. Otto leaves its protagonists, mostly young girls, make puzzling actions. Otto takes a neutral observer position and confronts the viewer with the process of growing up. By soft merging into one another light and shadow zones interrupted by harsh color accents, it produces a strong vitality. This creates body landscapes that their characters a strong authenticity.

Awards
2005: Volker-Hinniger Prize
2005: nominated for the Ernst Schering Foundation Art of the Ernst Schering Foundation
2011: Winner of the Art Prize of the Lüneburg Regional Association

Exhibitions
1997: portico, Frankfurt
2001: Darmstadt Secession at the Mathildenhöhe / Darmstadt
2002: Exhibition Hall, Frankfurt am Main
2003: Städel, Frankfurt am Main
2006: Kunsthalle der Hypo-Kulturstiftung, Munich
2007: Kunstverein Aschaffenburg
2009: Collection Rusche, Schloss Corvey
2009: Collection Rusche, Museum Abbey Liesborn
2010: Bomann Museum
2011: Kunsthalle Darmstadt
2011: Kunsthalle Villa Kobe, Halle / Saale
2011: Museum Schloss Gifhorn
2012: Jesuit Church Art Gallery, Aschaffenburg

References

Living people
1974 births
20th-century German women artists
21st-century German women artists
German women painters
Städelschule alumni

External Links

 Interview at Elemmental (Spanish)